The 2021 Port Adelaide Football Club season was the club's 25th season in the Australian Football League (AFL) and the 151st year since its inception in 1870. The club also fielded its reserves team in the South Australian National Football League (SANFL), having rejoined the competition after missing the previous season due to the COVID-19 pandemic.

Squad

AFL

SANFL

AFL season

Pre-season

Regular season

Finals series

Ladder

SANFL season

Pre-season

Regular season

Ladder

Awards

Power (AFL)
  – Ollie Wines
  – Travis Boak
  – Aliir Aliir
  – Travis Boak
  – Mitch Georgiades
  – Karl Amon
  – Travis Boak
Source:

Magpies (SANFL)
  – Sam Hayes
  – Joel Garner
  – Campbell Wildman
  – Dylan Williams (31 goals)
  – Bob O’Malley
Source:

Notes

References

External links
 Official website of the Port Adelaide Football Club
 Official website of the Australian Football League

2021
Port Adelaide Football Club